Kabiru Bello Dungurawa is a Nigerian academician, administrator, and the Rector of Kano State Polytechnic.

Early life and education 
Kabiru was born on 10 March 1973, at Dungurawa Village, of Dawakin Tofa Local Government Area, of Kano State. He attended Dungurawa Primary School, Kano between 1977 and 1983, he also attended Government Junior Secondary School, Kwa between 1983 and 1986, he also attended Dutse Teachers College (Grade II) between 1986 and 1989, Kabiru obtained National Certificate in Education from Federal College of Education Katsina Between 1995 and 1998 he also obtained Bachelor of Arts in Hausa and Master of Education in Guidance and Counselling from Bayero University Kano 2003 and 2009 respectively, Kabiru also obtained a Doctor of Philosophy in Guidance and Counselling from Ahmadu Bello University Zaria, in 2014.

Career
Kabiru started his career in 1990 as a classroom Teacher under Dawakin Tofa Local Government Education Authority and later joined Kano State Ministry of Education in 1996. Kabiru started his University career in 2007 under Bayero University Kano in the Department of Education, Faculty of Education were he held so many responsibilities from committees member, Level Coordinator up to the Head of the Education Department.

Kabiru served as a Visiting Lecturer in Yusuf Maitama Sule University Kano, Kano University of Science and Technology, Wudil, Federal University, Dutsin Ma, he was also a Part time lecturer at Skyline University and National Open University of Nigeria.

Kabiru was appointed Rector of Kano State Polytechnic by Kano State Governor Abdullahi Umar Ganduje in October 2020 who succeeded Professor Mukhtar Atiku Kurawa the Vice-Chancellor of Yusuf Maitama Sule University, Kano. 

Kabiru was promoted to the rank of Associate Professor (Professor of Sociology) by the Governing Council of Bayero University Kano on the 1st October 2021 but the news on the 9th December, 2022 in the news bulletin of Bayero University Kano

References

1973 births
Living people
Academic staff of Bayero University Kano
Ahmadu Bello University alumni
Bayero University Kano alumni
University of Benin (Nigeria) alumni